Hvaltorvet, or Hvaltorget, is the largest shopping mall in Sandefjord, Norway. It is located in the town square in the city centre. It first opened in 1989, but an expanded mall was opened on 20 November 2008. It is home to 7-63 stores including H&M, Jack & Jones, Lindex, Narvesen, Telenor, Vero Moda, and Teknikmagasinet.

Hvaltorvet is named in honor of the city’s iconic whaling epoch.

History
The location of the current mall was formerly a farm owned by Christopher Hvidt.

Kremmerhuset in Tønsberg was the first mall in Vestfold County when constructed in 1971. This is now known as Farmandstredet. The early 1990s saw the opening of Nordbyen in Larvik and Hvaltorvet in Sandefjord. In its first year, 1990, Hvaltorvet’s 13 shops had a turnover of NOK 107 million. In 1998, the mall’s 22 shops had a turnover of NOK 205 million.

Hvaltorvet was built in 1988. It officially opened on 12 October  1989. Mayor Per Foshaug undertook the symbolic opening of the mall by cutting a mooring cable with a flensing knife. Previously owned by Steen & Strøm Invest AS, it was purchased by Norske Liv AS in 1995. It was sold for NOK 170 million and Norske Liv AS became the owner on 1 January 1996. Its net revenue in 2003, which was NOK 233 million, was lower than three other malls in Vestfold: Sjøsiden (236 million), Nordbyen (440 million), and Farmandstredet (1,063 billion).

The mall was expanded in November 2008 to 27,000 m2. 65 apartments were built atop the mall after the 2008 expansion. 199 new parking spaces were also added during the expansion, bringing the total number to 400-500 spaces for parking. The main parking structure is located underneath the town square in the city centre.

References

Sandefjord
Buildings and structures in Sandefjord
Companies based in Sandefjord
1989 establishments in Norway
Shopping malls established in 1989